is a railway station on the Yurikamome Line, in Kōtō, Tokyo, Japan. Its station number is U-12. Opened on 1 November 1995, the station is located within walking distance to Kokusai-tenjijō Station on the Rinkai Line. The station served as the line's eastern terminus before the extension to Toyosu Station opened. However, some services from Shimbashi still terminates at Ariake.

Station layout
The station consists of two elevated island platforms serving three tracks.

Platforms

History
The station opened on 1 November 1995 as the eastern terminus of the Yurikamome Line. It became a through station from 27 March 2006 following the opening of the extension to Toyosu.

Surrounding area

 Kokusai-tenjijō Station (TWR Rinkai Line)
 Symbol Promenade Park
 Tokyo Big Sight (East Halls)
 Panasonic Centre Tokyo
 Ariake Tennis Forest Park
 Ariake Coliseum
 Japanese Foundation for Cancer Research Cancer Institute Hospital
 Tokyo Metropolitan Disaster Prevention Center
 Tokyo Bay Ariake Washington Hotel

A bus stop is located at the front of Kokusai-tenjijō Station.

Passenger statistics
In 2008, the station was used by an average of 2,293 passengers.

External links

 Official information site

Railway stations in Japan opened in 1995
Railway stations in Tokyo
Yurikamome